SNPedia (pronounced "snipedia") is a wiki-based bioinformatics web site that serves as a database of single nucleotide polymorphisms (SNPs). Each article on a SNP provides a short description, links to scientific articles and personal genomics web sites, as well as microarray information about that SNP. Thus SNPedia may support the interpretation of results of personal genotyping from, e.g., 23andMe and similar companies.

SNPedia is a semantic wiki, powered by MediaWiki and the Semantic MediaWiki extension.

SNPedia was created, and is run by, geneticist Greg Lennon and programmer Mike Cariaso, who at the time of the site's founding were both located in Bethesda, Maryland.

, the website has 537 medical conditions and 109,729 SNPs in its database. The number of SNPs in SNPedia has doubled roughly once every 14 months since August 2007.

On 7 September 2019, MyHeritage announced that they acquired both SNPedia and Promethease. All non-European raw genetic data files previously uploaded to Promethease, and not deleted by users by 1 Nov 2019, are to be copied to MyHeritage and the users will receive a free MyHeritage account with paid level of services, including Cousin Matching and Ethnicities.

Promethease
An associated computer program called Promethease, also developed by the SNPedia team, allows users to compare personal genetics results against the SNPedia database, generating a report with information about a person's attributes, such as propensity to diseases, based on the presence of specific SNPs within their genome.

In May 2008 Cariaso, using Promethease, won an online contest sponsored by 23andMe to determine as much information as possible about an anonymous woman based only on her genome. Cariaso won in all three categories of "accuracy, creativity and cleverness". In 2009, the anonymous woman ("Lilly Mendel") was revealed to be 23andMe co-founder Linda Avey, allowing a direct comparison between her actual traits and those predicted by Promethease a year earlier.

Reception
In a June 2008 article on personal genomics, a doctor from the Southern Illinois University School of Medicine said:

In January 2011, technology journalist Ronald Bailey posted the full result of his Promethease report online. Writing about his decision in Reason magazine, he stated:

Members of the medical community have criticised Promethease for technical complexity and a poorly defined "magnitude" scale that causes misconceptions, confusion and panic among its users.

See also 
 dbSNP
 Online Mendelian Inheritance in Man
 Full Genome Sequencing
 Predictive Medicine

References

External links 
 
 Michael Cariaso - Next-Gen Sequencing, Wikis and SNPedia, Webcast from Bio-ITWorld.com.
 

Biological databases
Genomics companies
MediaWiki websites
Semantic wikis
Mutation
Single-nucleotide polymorphisms